Saša Marinković (born 15 October 1986) is a Serbian footballer, who plays for Triglav Kranj in the Slovenian Second League.

References

External links
PrvaLiga profile 

1986 births
Living people
Serbian footballers
Association football midfielders
Serbian expatriate footballers
Serbian expatriate sportspeople in Switzerland
Expatriate footballers in Switzerland
Serbian expatriate sportspeople in Slovenia
Expatriate footballers in Slovenia
Serbian expatriate sportspeople in Austria
Expatriate footballers in Austria
NK Triglav Kranj players